Ice hockey at the 1998 Winter Olympics was played at The Big Hat and Aqua Wing Arena in Nagano, Japan.

Medal summary

Medal table

Medalists

Men's tournament

Qualification

Participating nations

Women's tournament 

This is the first year that women competed in Olympic hockey.

Participating nations

References

External links
Jeux Olympiques 1998
Olympic Qualifiers 1995-98

 
Oly
1998
1998
1998 in ice hockey
1998 Winter Olympics events